Lindenwood Stadium is a sport stadium in Belleville, Illinois.  The facility is primarily used by the Lindenwood University-Belleville athletic teams.

The turf is not the normal selection of green, but is instead alternating red and gray.  It has been called "The nation’s most original (hideous) football field."  As of the 2012 season, Lindenwood is only one of four programs to have the field color other than the traditional green and the only NAIA school to do so.  The first college football game played at the stadium was a 43–37 victory over the Avila Eagles on September 1, 2012.

The stadium is also used for local high school sporting events and other community events.

See also
 List of college football stadiums with non-traditional field colors

References

External links
 Lindenwood Lynx athletics home page

College football venues
Lindenwood–Belleville Lynx football
American football venues in Illinois
Buildings and structures in St. Clair County, Illinois
Sports venues completed in 2012
2012 establishments in Illinois